Magura National Park is a National Park located in the south-east of Poland, close to Slovakia, on the boundary of Lesser Poland Voivodeship and Subcarpathian Voivodeship. It covers the main part of the upper basin of the Wisłoka river. When the park was created in 1995 it covered 199.62 km2, although it is now only , of which 185.31 km2 is forest.

The park takes its name from the massif known as Magura Wątkowska, after Wątkowa, its highest peak. Magura is also the name of the second-highest peak of this massif.

The landscape

Magurski National Park's landscape is typical of the Beskid Niski ridge and consists mainly of heavily forested low and medium peaks. The park features fancifully sculpted rocks. The huge Devil's Rock wrapped in mystery is the most prominent among these rock formations. Other significant hills are Magura (842 m), Wielka Góra (719 m) and Nad Tysowym (713 m).

The Wisłoka river and its tributaries are some of the most important elements of the park. The Wisłoka is a typical mountain river, which creates picturesque ravines and frequently changes its course.

The Kornuty nature reserve is located at the heart of the park, protecting the constellations of its fancifully sculpted sandstones. Their unusual shapes are due to erosion. The rocks conceal numerous fracture caves, including the best known Mroczna [Murky] Cave, whose corridors are 200 metres long.

Flora and fauna

Plant life is of a transitional character and reflects the park's location - between the Eastern and Western Carpathians.  The majority of the park is forest. Spruce is not frequent here, which means that the woodland is for the most part natural.

Animal life is very rich in the park - there are 137 species of birds, including several endangered such as the eagle and eagle-owl as well as the stork.  There are also 35 endangered mammal species  including the brown bear (they roam back and forth between Poland and Slovakia), lynx, wildcat, wolf and otter. One can also find fish, snakes, salamanders and numerous insects. It is estimated that within the park there are 200 species of endangered animals.

Human settlement

The oldest trace of human settlement in this area are remains of a stronghold at Brzezowa, on the Walik mountain. It was part of the system of strongholds built by the Wislanie tribe in the 9th century on the Southern border of their lands. Also, one can find small, wooden Orthodox churches, which were built by the eastern Slavic Lemkos. Unfortunately, some of these buildings are ruined. In one of the farmers’ huts, at the village of Kolonia Olchowiec, there is a small, private museum of Lemko culture.

There are also numerous cemeteries from World War I, as this area was for a long time a battleground between the Russian and Austro-German armies. A tragic reminder of World War II is the cemetery of 1250 Jews, who were killed by the Nazis in 1942 at the Halbów pass.

The park has its headquarters in the village of Krempna.

References

National parks of Poland
Protected areas established in 1995
Protected areas of the Eastern Carpathians
Parks in Lesser Poland Voivodeship
Parks in Podkarpackie Voivodeship
1995 establishments in Poland
Gorlice County